Yohei Takeda (武田 洋平, born June 30, 1987) is a Japanese football player for Nagoya Grampus.

National team career
In July 2007, Takeda was elected Japan U-20 national team for 2007 U-20 World Cup. At this tournament, he played 1 match against Nigeria.

Club statistics
Updated to 19 July 2022.

1Includes J1 Playoffs and J2/J3 Playoffs.

Honours
Nagoya Grampus
J.League Cup: 2021

References

External links

Profile at Nagoya Grampus

1987 births
Living people
Association football people from Osaka Prefecture
People from Hirakata
Japanese footballers
Japan youth international footballers
J1 League players
J2 League players
Shimizu S-Pulse players
Albirex Niigata players
Gamba Osaka players
Cerezo Osaka players
Oita Trinita players
Nagoya Grampus players
Association football goalkeepers